Make My Move is the second studio album by Canadian country music singer-songwriter Jason Blaine. The album was released by Koch on May 20, 2008.

Track listing

Chart performance

Singles

External links
Jason Blaine – "Make My Move"

2008 albums
Jason Blaine albums
E1 Music albums